HMS Tobago has been the name of more than one ship of the British Royal Navy, and may refer to:

 HMS Tobago was the brig-sloop privateer , launched at Connecticut in 1777, which  captured in March 1779; the Royal Navy sold her in 1783
 , a schooner purchased in 1805, captured by France in 1806, recaptured by the Royal Navy in 1809 and sold
 , a destroyer launched in 1918 and sold in 1922
 , a frigate in commission from 1944 to 1945

Royal Navy ship names